Quaas is a surname. Notable people with the surname include:

 Johanna Quaas (born 1925), German gymnast
 Thomas-Bernd Quaas (born 1952), German businessman
  (born 1965), German actor